Dongying is a district and the seat of Dongying in the Chinese province of Shandong.

Administrative divisions
As 2012, this district is divided to 6 subdistricts and 4 towns.
Subdistricts

Towns

References

County-level divisions of Shandong